Macaria fusca is a moth of the family Geometridae first described by Carl Peter Thunberg in 1792. It is found in Alps, Fennoscandia, the Ural, northern Yakutia and Kamchatka. It is found at elevations of up to 3,400 meters.

The wingspan is 14–18 mm for males. Females have considerably smaller wings and can only fly with difficulty. Males are on wing from July to August and are day active.

The larvae feed on the leaves of various low-growing plants, including Erophila verna and Viola calcarata.

External links
Fauna Europaea

Lepiforum e.V.
Schmetterlinge-Eeutschlands.de

Macariini
Moths of Europe
Taxa named by Carl Peter Thunberg
Moths described in 1792